The FS E.424 is a class of Italian railways electric locomotives. They were built in 1943-1951 and have been decommissioned in 2008.

History
After the realization of the 6-axle E.636, it was however decided to revamp the project by adapting to it some solutions already in use on the E.636 (engines, bogies, suspension etc.).

Breda SpA workshop provided the three prototypes of E.424 in 1943-1944. Mass production, however, could begin only after the end of World War II, part of the funds provided by the United Nations Relief and Rehabilitation Administration program.

Series 

The locomotives have been built in four series starting from 1943:
 004-013, compound-type 92-250 motors (as unit 003), max speed , 19/65 gear ratio.
Units from 039 to 056 and from 079 to 158 had the same motors and gear ratio as the latters, but 5 field shunts, except for unit 136 that had 19/65 gear ratio (max speed ). Unit 068 was transformed, from November 1954 to May 1974, into unit E434-068: this unit had 4 double 82-333 motors, 2 shunts and -able 20/69 gear ratio; they have been used as experiments for the following FS Class E.646 locomotives.
These units are also referred to as E.424N, where "N" stands for "Navetta" (push-pull); also, number 200 has been added to units' serial number (i.e. E.424.116 became E.424.316).

Technique 

Class E.424, having DC type motors like all the Italian locomotives of the time, is a rheostatic-type locomotive; on start, a rheostat is connected in series to the motors and is gradually excluded as speed builds up allowing more current to flow to the motors; unlike other rheostatic locomotives of that time, this is not achieved via the characteristic lever (Maniglione), but through an automatic system, called Avviatore Automatico, derived from contemporary first-generation ALe 790/880/883 EMUs.

The driver simply selects the combination (series or parallel), and the relative rheostat contactors are automatically and gradually closed by this system; in case of failure, the driver can manually rotate an apposite wheel (that also usually rotates automatically as the system advances) to proceed with the exclusion.

When the rheostat is completely excluded for the series combination, field shunts can be inserted, or the driver can proceed to parallel combination, making a transition, which is handled by a device called "CEM" that automatically combines the motors (closing various contacts) accordingly.

Originally more than one unit could be coupled and be controlled remotely by the first locomotive using a system called Comando Multiplo; on the central part of the cab there also was a door that enabled the crew to pass from one locomotive to another in case of problems. However, because of safety issues and the imperfect reliability of this system (there were no instruments indicating the status of the slave locomotive, so it was not certain if it correctly made a transition or not, for example), it  was abandoned and then disassembled.

See also 
 FS Class E.646
 FS Class E.636

External links 

 Detailed history of the group (Italian)

E.424
Bo′Bo′ locomotives
3000 V DC locomotives
Railway locomotives introduced in 1943
Gio. Ansaldo & C. locomotives
Breda locomotives
Reggiane locomotives
Scrapped locomotives
Standard gauge locomotives of Italy
Bo′Bo′ electric locomotives of Europe